Claydon (meaning 'Clay Hill') is a place name in:

England
 Claydon, Oxfordshire
 Claydon, Suffolk 
 Claydon (deanery), Buckinghamshire
 Claydon House, Buckinghamshire, originally home of the Verney family (relatives of Florence Nightingale) and now in the care of the National Trust
 Botolph Claydon, Buckinghamshire
 East Claydon, Buckinghamshire
 Middle Claydon, Buckinghamshire
 Steeple Claydon, Buckinghamshire
 Claydon with Clattercot, civil parish in Oxfordshire
 Claydon railway station (Buckinghamshire)
 Claydon railway station (Suffolk)

Other
 Claydon, Saskatchewan, Canada
 Claydon Peak, Antarctica
 George Claydon (1933–2001), English actor
 Mitch Claydon, Australian-English cricketer

Related
Claydon Map of the course of the river beside Claydon House

See also
Clayton (disambiguation)

English-language surnames